Mpeke Town is a Ugandan-Kenyan television and radio drama series that premiered in Uganda on June 11, 2018. The first season of the series aired on Urban TV Uganda in English, Bukedde TV and Bukedde radio in Luganda. It was produced by Kenyan producer Patricia Gichinga under Kenyan production company The Mediae Company known for Shamba Shape Up and Makutano Junction.

Plot
Having failed at success in the big city, Isaiah returns to his little village town Kabulondo Mpeke where his encounter with the determined Isabella thrusts him into a whirlwind of possibility and he discovers the untapped potential in agribusiness.

Cast
The series is made up of an ensemble cast of Stephen Katusiime, Patience Nakamya, Frobisher Lwanga, Oyenbot, Michael Musoke, Philip Luswata, Hellen Lukoma.

Episodes

Series overview
{| class="wikitable" style="text-align:center"
|-
! style="padding: 0 8px;" colspan="2" rowspan="2"| Season
! style="padding: 0 8px;" rowspan="2"| Episodes
! colspan="2"| Originally aired 
|-
! style="padding: 0 8px;"| First aired
! style="padding: 0 8px;"| Last aired
|-
 |style="background: #F2BB00;"|
 | 1
 | 13
 | style="padding:0 8px;"| 
 | style="padding:0 8px;"| 
|- 
|}

Season 1

External links

References

Ugandan drama television series
Kenyan television series
2018 Ugandan television series debuts
2018 Kenyan television series debuts
2010s Ugandan television series
2010s Kenyan television series